Sergio Casal and Emilio Sánchez were the defending champions, but Casal did not compete this year. Sánchez teamed up with Javier Sánchez and lost in the semifinals to Paul Haarhuis and Mark Koevermans.

The tournament was finished with no champions, as the final between Tomás Carbonell and Diego Pérez against Paul Haarhuis and Mark Koevermans was cancelled due to rain.

Seeds

Draw

Draw

References

External links
 Official results archive (ATP)
 Official results archive (ITF)

Doubles